Thailand competed at the 2016 Summer Paralympics in Rio de Janeiro, Brazil, from 7 September to 18 September 2016.

Competitors

Disability classifications

Every participant at the Paralympics has their disability grouped into one of five disability categories; amputation, the condition may be congenital or sustained through injury or illness; cerebral palsy; wheelchair athletes, there is often overlap between this and other categories; visual impairment, including blindness; Les autres, any physical disability that does not fall strictly under one of the other categories, for example dwarfism or multiple sclerosis. Each Paralympic sport then has its own classifications, dependent upon the specific physical demands of competition. Events are given a code, made of numbers and letters, describing the type of event and classification of the athletes competing. Some sports, such as athletics, divide athletes by both the category and severity of their disabilities, other sports, for example swimming, group competitors from different categories together, the only separation being based on the severity of the disability.

Medallists

| width="78%" valign="top" |

|  style="text-align:left; width:22%; vertical-align:top;"|

Archery

Thailand qualified one archer for the Rio Games following their performance at the 2015 World Archery Para Championships. Wasana Khuthawisap earned the spot after making the round of sixteen in the  recurve women's open event.

Individual

Team

Athletics 

Men
Track

Field

Women
Track

Field

Boccia 

Thailand qualified for the 2016 Summer Paralympics in this sport at the Hong Kong hosted 2015 BISFed Asia and Oceania Boccia Team and Pairs Championships in the BC1/BC2 Team event.  They claimed gold ahead of silver medalist South Korea and bronze medalists Japan. They were the only team in round robin play that won every game, with China, Japan and South Korea all winning 3 games and losing 2 games.  Their placing was based point difference. The team included Pattaya Tadtong, Witsanu Huadpradit, Watcharaphon Vongsa, and Worawut Saengampa. They entered the qualifying event as the top seeded team in Asia, ranked third in the world.  China was the next highest ranked at ninth in the world, and were the second seed in this category.

Individual

Pairs and teams

Judo

Powerlifting

Shooting

The third opportunity for direct qualification for shooters to the Rio Paralympics took place at the 2015 IPC Shooting World Cup in Sydney, Australia.  At this competition, Somporn Muangsiri earned a qualifying spot for their country in the P2- Women's 10m Air Pistol SH1 event. Bordin Sornsriwichai earned a second spot for Thailand in the P4 – Mixed 50m Pistol SH1 event.  As no woman met the qualifying criteria in the R6- Mixed 50m Rifle Prone SH1 event, the spot was re-allocated to R3 – Mixed 10m Air Rifle Prone SH1. Chutima Saenlar claimed this spot for Thailand. Atidet Intanon claimed the country's third spot at this competition based on their performance in the R7- Men's 50m Rifle 3 Positions event.

Swimming 

Men

Women

Table tennis 

Men

Women

Teams

Wheelchair fencing

Wheelchair tennis 

The first place the country qualified was for one athlete in wheelchair tennis. Sakhorn Khanthasit was named via the standard qualification process, and goes into Rio as the 2014 Para Asian Games women's singles champion. Suthi Khlongrua earned a slot in Rio in the men's singles event via a Bipartite Commission Invitation place

See also
Thailand at the 2016 Summer Olympics

References

Thailand
2016
Paralympics